Banda Pachuco is a Mexican music group, formed in 1993. They reached number 5 in the Billboard Hot Latin Tracks with their song "Mitad Tu, Mitad Yo", in 1995. They made a big hit with their album Terco Corazon, released in 1998 and welcoming a new singer, Neo Serrato. At the start of the year 2000 they made a new album, "Sueno Con Salma". On  that same CD, the song "Aqui Ya De nada sirvo", composed by Jose S. Corral, made a big hit throughout all Latin America. By the following year, Neo Serrato left the Band to sing alone.

Discography
1994: Pachuco bailarín (Album debut and first on Fonovisa Records)
1995: Sabor a chocolate
1995: Por los caminos de la vida
1996: Lowrider 
1997: La más querida 
1998: Terco corazón (Last album on Fonovisa Records)
2000: Sueño con Salma (First album on Luna/Sony Music)
2001: Pierdete Conmigo
2002: Quedate Conmigo
2003: Moviendo tu censurado (Last album on Luna/Sony Music)
2006: Infierno y Gloria (Only album on Batuta Records)
2008: Quiero Contigo (First album on Balboa Records)
2009: Lo qué siento por ti
2012: Loco suicida

References

Mexican musical groups